Events from the year 1997 in Algeria.

Incumbents
President: Liamine Zéroual
Prime Minister: Ahmed Ouyahia

Events
April 3–4 – Thalit massacre
April 21 – Haouch Khemisti massacre
June 5 – Algerian legislative elections, 1997
June 16 – Dairat Labguer massacre
July 27 – Si-Zerrouk massacre
August 3 – Oued El-Had and Mezouara massacre
August 20–21 – Souhane massacre
August 26 – Beni-Ali massacre
August 29 – Rais massacre
September 5–6 – Beni-Messous massacre
September 19 – Guelb El-Kebir massacre
September 22 – Bentalha massacre
December 23–24 – Sid El-Antri massacre
December 30 – Wilaya of Relizane massacres of 30 December 1997

Births

Deaths

References

 
1990s in Algeria